Abdirahman Ahmed Ali Tuur (var. "Tur", "Tour", meaning "Hunchback") (November 6, 1931 - November 8, 2003) was a Somali politician who served as the first President of Somaliland from 1991 to 1993. Tuur also served as the Chairman of the Somali National Movement from 1990 to 1991.

Biography
Tuur was born on November 6, 1931 in Burao, then a part of the British Somaliland protectorate. He hailed from the Muse Arreh sub clan of the Garhajis.

He was one of the top student that graduated from the first Intermediate School in British Somaliland Protectorate and was given a scholarship to Sudan in 1948 to study at the renowned Hantoob secondary School. In Hantoob, he met and befriended with some of the future Sudanese leaders like Jaafar Nimeiry, Sadiq Al-Mahdi and Hassan Al-Turabi. Abdirahman excelled both in sports (especially football and track) and in academic studies. He later received an additional scholarship to study at the University of Exeter.

After successfully completing his university in the UK, Abdirahman returned and started his career as an Administrative Officer in Borama in 1956 and was elevated to the position of District Commissioner (DC) 3 years later (1959). In 1961 he became Governor of the Eastern Region (Burao) and then in 1964 the Governor of Western Region (Hargeisa). In that same year he joined the Ministry of Foreign Affairs where he was appointed in the following diplomatic posts:
Sudan 1964-1968 and 1970-1971 Ambassador
Ethiopia 1972-1977 Ambassador
East Germany 1978-1981 Ambassador
UAE 1981-1983 Ambassador

He later became the Chairman of the Somali National Movement (SNM), a guerilla force mainly drawn from his Isaaq clan, which was attempting to topple former President of Somalia Siad Barre's military regime. Although the SNM at its inception had a unionist constitution, it eventually began to pursue a separatist agenda, looking to secede from the rest of Somalia. Under Tuur's leadership, the local administration declared the northwestern Somali territories independent on 18 May 1991. He then became the newly established Somaliland’s first President, but subsequently renounced the separatist platform in 1994. Tuur concurrently began instead to publicly seek and advocate reconciliation with the rest of Somalia under a power-sharing federal system of governance. In doing so, he also represented the interests of many other Isaaq members, who were against secession. Tuur additionally lent some support to the UNOSOM peace-building mission in the southern regions.

Death
Tuur died on November 8, 2003 at the age of 72 and was buried in Burao, Somaliland.

References

Sources
Somalia - Worldstatesmen.com
"Somaliland: The Other Somalia with No War", Suliman Baldo in The Nation (Nairobi), 30 June 2006, The Nation (Nairobi)
THE SECRETARY-GENERAL'S REPORT, ABDIRAHMAN "TUUR", AND SOMALILAND, SOMALIA  News Update,  Vol 3, No 16, May 28, 1994. ISSN 1103-1999

1931 births
2003 deaths
Chairmen of the Somali National Movement
Somali National Movement
Presidents of Somaliland
Vice presidents of Somaliland
Somaliland politicians
British Somaliland people of World War II
People from Burao
20th-century presidents of Somaliland